Flirt is a 1995 drama film written and directed by Hal Hartley and produced by Good Machine.

Introduction
The story takes place in New York, Berlin and Tokyo, with each segment using the same dialogue.

In New York, Bill struggles to decide whether he has a future with Emily, while attempting to restrain Walter, the angry husband of a woman he thinks he might be in love with.

In Berlin, Dwight has a similar experience with his lover, while the events that befall Miho in Tokyo take a more dramatic turn.

Cast  
 Martin Donovan as	Walter
 Dwight Ewell as Dwight
 Geno Lechner as Greta
 Parker Posey as Emily
 Bill Sage as Bill
 Miho Nikaido as Miho
 Hal Hartley as Hal
 Toshizo Fujiwara as Ozu
 Peter Fitz as The Doctor
 Chikako Hara as Yuki
 Liana Pai as Woman at Phone Booth
 Harold Perrineau, Jr. as Man #1
 Maria Schrader as Girl In Phone Booth
 José Zúñiga as Driver
 Hannah Sullivan as Margaret
 Michael Imperioli  as Concerned Bar Patron

References

External links
 
 

1995 films
1995 drama films
American drama films
Films directed by Hal Hartley
Films set in Berlin
Films set in Japan
Films shot in New York (state)
Films shot in Tokyo
1990s German-language films
American independent films
1990s Japanese-language films
American avant-garde and experimental films
German avant-garde and experimental films
German independent films
Japanese avant-garde and experimental films
Japanese independent films
1990s avant-garde and experimental films
1995 independent films
1990s English-language films
1990s American films
1990s Japanese films
1990s German films